Elaphriella corona is a species of sea snail, a marine gastropod mollusk in the family Solariellidae.

Description

Distribution
This marine species occurs off Indonesia.

References

 Vilvens, C., 2009 New species and new records of Solariellidae (Gastropoda: Trochoidea) from Indonesia and Taiwan. Novapex 10(3): 69-96
Mémoires du Muséum national d'Histoire naturelle 208: 267-289

External links
 Williams S.T., Kano Y., Warén A. & Herbert D.G. (2020). Marrying molecules and morphology: first steps towards a reevaluation of solariellid genera (Gastropoda: Trochoidea) in the light of molecular phylogenetic studies. Journal of Molluscan Studies. 86(1): 1–26.

corona
Gastropods described in 2001